Eberharter is a surname, originating from Tyrol, Austria. Notable people with the surname include:
 Alfred Eberharter (born 1951), founding member of the band Schürzenjäger
 Herman P. Eberharter (1892-1958), Democratic member of the U.S. House of Representatives from Pennsylvania
 Stephan Eberharter (born 1969), Austrian alpine ski racer

German-language surnames